KUOA (1290 kHz) is a commercial AM radio station licensed to Siloam Springs, Arkansas.  It serves Northwest Arkansas, including Fayetteville and Bentonville.  KUOA simulcasts the sports radio format heard on co-owned 99.5 KAKS and is owned by Jesus Gabriel Hernandez, through licensee Maxx Media Radio, LLC.  The two stations are known as "ESPN Northwest Arkansas."   They carry Arkansas-based sports shows in morning drive time and during the afternoon.  A nationally syndicated sports show hosted by Dan Le Batard is heard in late mornings and ESPN Radio is carried nights and weekends.

KUOA has a daytime power of 5,000 watts.  But to protect other stations on AM 1290, it greatly reduces power at night to 31 watts.  It uses a non-directional antenna.  The transmitter is off West University Street in Siloam Springs, near the Arkansas-Oklahoma border.  Programming is also heard on FM translator 95.3 K237GR in Johnson.

History
On April 12, 1923, the station signed on the air.  It originally was a daytimer, required to go off the air at sunset, when radio waves travel farther.  The original frequency was 1260 kilocycles, moving to AM 1290 with the enactment in 1941 of the North American Regional Broadcasting Agreement (NARBA).

The station was acquired by John Brown University in 1933.  It was run as a Christian radio station, carrying religious programs and Southern Gospel music.  In 1947, it added an FM station at 105.7, using the call sign KUOA-FM.  The two stations were network affiliates of the Mutual Broadcasting System.  The FM station was later sold to separate owners and is now KMCK-FM, a Top 40 station.

In 2005, the university sold the AM radio station to longtime Northwest Arkansas broadcaster Dewey Johnson.  But he retired due to health problems. The station was sold later that year to Galen O. Gilbert, a former JBU student who had owned radio stations in Missouri, Oklahoma, and Texas.  Gilbert started a classic country format on the station.

The station was sold in August 2008 to longtime Arkansas broadcaster Jay Bunyard, and became an all-sports radio station known as "The Hog". Paired with a brand new Fayetteville-licensed FM translator at 105.3 FM, the radio station aired live and local programming throughout the day, and focused mainly on Arkansas Razorbacks athletics.

In 2010, Bunyard purchased FM 99.5 KAKS, and The Hog was simulcast on its 25,000 watt signal.  On December 13, 2012, KUOA split from its simulcast with sports-formatted KAKS 99.5 FM and changed to a talk radio format, branded as "AM 1290 The Mouth".

On January 1, 2015, the talk programming was discontinued.  KUOA resumed simulcasting sports-formatted KAKS 99.5 FM.

KUOA began airing its programming on FM translator K249EV 97.7 MHz, licensed to Johnson, Arkansas. In November 2016, the translator moved its frequency to 95.3 FM, as K237GR.

Hog Radio sold KUOA to Jesus Gabriel Hernandez's Maxx Media Radio, LLC for $50,000 effective April 30, 2021.

References

External links

UOA
Radio stations established in 1984